The group stage of the 2011–12 EHF Champions League was held from 28 September 2011 till 26 February 2012. The top four teams advanced to the Round of last 16.

Seedings
The draw for the group stage took place at the Gartenhotel Altmannsdorf in Vienna on 28 June 2011 at 11:00 local time. A total of 24 teams were drawn into four groups of six. Teams were divided into six pots, based on EHF coefficients. Clubs from the same pot or the same association could not be drawn into the same group, except the wild card tournament winner, which did not enjoy any protection.

Group A

Group B

Group C

Group D

References

External links
EHF Site

2011–12 EHF Champions League